Sir John Savage (1814 - 1883) was the mayor of Belfast, Ireland (now Northern Ireland) in 1872.

Born in 1814 in Glenavy, a town in Antrim, he was knighted upon becoming mayor of Belfast.

Following a riot in the Summer of 1872 that served as a precursor to the 1886 Belfast Riots, he put forth a proclamation that closed public houses for a week, authorized government forces to disperse any public gatherings, and  authorized government forces to enter any buildings where shots had been fired.

Savage eventually removed constabulary forces from the city, citing the "perfectly peaceful condition" that had arisen after hostilities had cooled.

He married a woman named Mary Turtle in 1838, and died in 1883, allegedly committing suicide without reason.

See also 
 Lord Mayor of Belfast

References 

1814 births
1883 deaths
Mayors of Belfast